Verguleasa is a commune in Olt County, Muntenia, Romania. It is composed of seven villages: Căzănești, Cucueți, Dumitrești, Poganu, Valea Fetei, Vânești and Verguleasa.

References

Communes in Olt County
Localities in Muntenia